Giancarlo Piretta (born 20 March 1942) is an Italian rower. He competed in the men's coxed pair event at the 1960 Summer Olympics.

References

1942 births
Living people
Italian male rowers
Olympic rowers of Italy
Rowers at the 1960 Summer Olympics
Sportspeople from Turin